The Maywood Historic District is a national historic district located in Arlington County, Virginia. It contains 198 contributing buildings in a residential neighborhood located in the northern part of the county. The area was platted and subdivided in five sections between 1909 and 1913 following the arrival in 1906 of the Great Falls and Old Dominion Railroad (later the Great Falls Division of the Washington and Old Dominion Railway). The area was primarily developed between 1909 and 1929.  The dwelling styles include a variety of architectural styles, including Queen Anne, Colonial Revival foursquares, Bungalow, and two-story gable-front houses. Several dwellings in the neighborhood have been identified as prefabricated mail-order houses.

The Arlington County Board designated the neighborhood to be a local historic district on July 7, 1990.  The National Park Service listed the neighborhood on the National Register of Historic Places on May 22, 2003.

See also
 List of Arlington County Historic Districts

References

Houses on the National Register of Historic Places in Virginia
Queen Anne architecture in Virginia
Colonial Revival architecture in Virginia
Arlington County Historic Districts
National Register of Historic Places in Arlington County, Virginia
Houses in Arlington County, Virginia
Historic districts on the National Register of Historic Places in Virginia